Tlaltenango, Mexican toponym, may mean:

Tlaltenango de Sánchez Román, Zacatecas
Tlaltenango, Puebla
Tlaltenango, Morelos